Khallikot railway station is a railway station on the East Coast Railway network in the state of Odisha, India. It serves Khallikot town. Its code is KIT. It has three platforms. Passenger, MEMU, Express and Superfast trains halt at Khallikot railway station.

Major trains

 East Coast Express
 Hirakhand Express
 Bhubaneshwar–Visakhapatnam Intercity Express
 Puri–Tirupati Express
 Puri–Ahmedabad Express
 Prashanti Express

Gallery

See also
 Ganjam district

References

Railway stations in Ganjam district
Khurda Road railway division